Jayson Gonzales (born 2 May 1969, Quezon City) is a Filipino chess grandmaster (2008).

He played for the Philippines in the Chess Olympiads of 2004 and 2008. In 1998, he won the Southern California Open. In 2001, he tied for 4–5th with Alan Sayson in the Philippine Chess Championship. In 2004, tied for 3rd–4th with Sergei Tiviakov in the Calvia Open and came third behind Jaan Ehlvest and John Fedorowicz in the 88th Marshall Chess Club Championship in New York. In 2008, he tied for 2nd–3rd with Ashot Nadanian in the 1st Leg ASEAN Circuit Chess Tournament in Tarakan and came second in the 1st Subic International Open Tournament.

On the May 2012 FIDE list, he has an Elo rating of 2405. His handle on the Internet Chess Club is "veracity".

References

External links

1969 births
Living people
People from Quezon City
Sportspeople from Quezon City
Filipino chess players
Chess grandmasters
Chess Olympiad competitors